Al-Tasamoh FC  is a Saudi Arabian football (soccer) team in Al Qunfudhah playing at the Saudi Fourth Division.

Current squad 

As of Saudi Third Division:

References

Football clubs in Saudi Arabia
Football clubs in Al Qunfudhah